A bible, also known as a show bible or pitch bible, is a reference document used by screenwriters for information on characters, settings, and other elements of a television or film project.

Types
Bibles are updated with information on the characters after the information has been established on screen. For example, the Frasier show bible was "scrupulously maintained", and anything established on air — "the name of Frasier's mother, Niles' favorite professor, Martin's favorite bar...even a list of Maris' [dozens of] food allergies" — was reflected in the bible. The updated bible then serves as a resource for writers to keep everything within the series consistent. 

Other bibles are used as sales documents to help a television network or studio understand a series, and are sometimes given to new writers when they join the writing staff for the same reason. These types of bibles discuss the backstories of the main characters and the history of the series' fictional universe.

Television series often rely on writers' assistants and script coordinators to serve as "walking bibles" in remembering details about a series.

Writers Guild of America
In the United States, writing the bible of a produced series earns that writer the 24 units of required credit necessary to qualify for membership in the Writers Guild of America.

See also
 Canon (fiction)
 Prompt-book

References

External links
How to Write a TV Bible

Continuity (fiction)
Reference works
Television terminology